Károly Dietz (21 July 1885 – 9 July 1969) was a Hungarian football manager who coached Hungary in the 1938 FIFA World Cup. He also played for Magyar AC and Műegyetemi AFC.

References

1885 births
1969 deaths
Hungarian footballers
Hungarian football managers
Hungary national football team managers
1938 FIFA World Cup managers
Hungarian people of German descent
People from Sopron
Association footballers not categorized by position
Sportspeople from Győr-Moson-Sopron County